is a district in Okayama Prefecture, Japan.

Towns and villages
Kumenan
Misaki

Mergers
On February 28, 2005, the town of Kume merged into the city of Tsuyama.
On March 22, 2005, the towns of Chūō, Asahi, and Yanahara merged to form the new town of Misaki.

Districts in Okayama Prefecture